USS Watauga was a proposed United States Navy screw frigate that was never built.

Projected as a screw frigate, Watauga was intended to be similar to, but somewhat larger than, the Java-class frigates (USS Antietam, USS Guerriere, USS Minnetonka, and USS Piscataqua).

Although first carried on the Navy List in 1864, Watauga was never laid down. The contract for her construction was cancelled in 1866.

Notes

References

Chesneau, Roger, and Eugene M. Kolesnik. Conway's All the World's Fighting Ships 1860–1905. New York: Mayflower Books, Inc., 1979. .

American Civil War ships of the United States
Sailing frigates of the United States Navy
Cancelled ships of the United States Navy